MLS Cup Final Referees are the referees chosen for the MLS Cup, the championship match in Major League Soccer, the top tier soccer league in the United States and Canada.

Referees

References

Referees
MLS Cup